Seljord Lake (Seljordsvatnet) is a lake in the municipality Seljord in Vestfold og Telemark, Norway. The main influx river is Vallaråi, and the lake drains through Bøelva. According to local folklore Selma, a sea serpent lives in the lake.

References

Lakes of Vestfold og Telemark
Seljord